Joseph Edward Fidler (1885–1948) was an English professional football left back who played in the Football League for Woolwich Arsenal and Sheffield United.

Playing career
Fidler joined Sheffield United from South Street New Connexion, and played one First Division game in both the 1903–04 and 1904–05 seasons. He moved on to Fulham and then Queens Park Rangers, spending six years at QPR. He joined Woolwich Arsenal in February 1913, and played 13 games as the club were relegated out of the First Division and into the Second Division at the end of the 1912–13 campaign. With Jack Peart out injured, he was partnered with Joe Shaw at full-back for the last 13 games of the 1912–13 season and first ten matches of the 1913–14 campaign, before he was dropped for England international Bob Benson. He joined Port Vale of the Central League in summer 1914, but was unable to establish himself in the first team at the Old Recreation Ground.

Military service
In January 1915 he enlisted in the 17th (Service) Battalion of the Duke of Cambridge's Own (Middlesex Regiment) to fight in World War I. Due to the number of footballers who were placed there it was nicknamed the Football Battalion.

Career statistics

References

1885 births
1948 deaths
Footballers from Sheffield
English footballers
Association football fullbacks
Middlesex Regiment soldiers
Sheffield United F.C. players
Fulham F.C. players
Queens Park Rangers F.C. players
Arsenal F.C. players
Port Vale F.C. players
English Football League players
Southern Football League players
Southern Football League representative players
British Army personnel of World War I
Date of birth unknown
Date of death unknown
Military personnel from Sheffield